Ma Boy is a 2012 South Korean television series starring Kim So-hyun and Kim Sun-woong in the first teen drama aired by Tooniverse. The drama was produced by CJ E&M Pictures and Penta E&C. The OST of the mini series was recorded by girl group CHI CHI.

The series was streamed online on YouTube.

Plot
Jang Geu-rim dreams about becoming a singer and transfers to an elite musical high school where her favorite K-pop idol, Tae-joon also studies. She hopelessly gets entangled in secrets when she becomes the roommate of Irene, the most admired girl in the school – who turns out to be a boy in disguise.

Cast
Main cast:
 Kim So-hyun as Jang Geu-rim
 Kim Sun-woong as Irene/Hyun Woo
 Min Hoo (민후) as Tae-joon
 Kim Ha-yeon (김하연) as Ji-soo
 Kang Hyun-joong (강현중) as Lee Eok-man
 Park Hee-gon (박희곤) as Hoon-nam

References

External links
 Ma Boy at Daum Movie 
 

2012 South Korean television series debuts
2012 South Korean television series endings
Television series by CJ E&M
Tooniverse original programming